Bompas is the name of the following communes in France:

 Bompas, Ariège, in the Ariège department
 Bompas, Pyrénées-Orientales, in the Pyrénées-Orientales department